Patricia Karen Bunch (June 22, 1939 – January 30, 2023) was an American country music songwriter. Much of her earlier chart hits resulted from collaborations with fellow songwriters Mary Ann Kennedy and Pam Rose. Bunch also had multiple chart successes co-writing with Doug Johnson. Bunch's co-writing credits include the Grammy Award-nominated song "I'll Still Be Loving You" by Restless Heart. Other songs that she has written include "Wild One" by Faith Hill and "Living in a Moment" by Ty Herndon.

Bunch died at her home in Cross Plains, Tennessee, on January 30, 2023, at the age of 83.

Chart singles
The following is a list of Pat Bunch compositions that were chart hits.

References

1939 births
2023 deaths
American women country singers
American country singer-songwriters
21st-century American women